The men's 1500 metres event  at the 1974 European Athletics Indoor Championships was held on 10 March in Gothenburg.

Results

References

1500 metres at the European Athletics Indoor Championships
1500